The 1994 United States federal budget is the United States federal budget to fund government operations for the fiscal year 1994, which was October 1993 – September 1994.  This budget was the first federal budget submitted by Bill Clinton.

Receipts

(in billions of dollars)

Outlays
The total outlays for FY1994 was 1.46 trillion dollars as authorized by congress.

Deficit/Surplus
The budget had an estimated deficit for enacted legislation of $203 billion.2.8% of GDP

References

1994
1994 in American politics
United States federal budget